Axinaea merianiae is a species of plant in the family Melastomataceae. It is endemic to Ecuador.  Its natural habitats are subtropical or tropical dry shrubland and subtropical or tropical high-altitude shrubland.

References

Endemic flora of Ecuador
merianiae
Least concern plants
Taxonomy articles created by Polbot